Acacia oswaldii, commonly known as boree, umbrella wattle, umbrella bush, whyacka, middia, miljee, nella and curly yarran, is a shrub or tree of the genus Acacia and the subgenus Plurinerves.

Description
It has terete and glabrous branchlets with many red, resinous micro-hairs. Leaves are hairy when young, becoming hairless, edges smooth, with a straight often sharp point.

It blooms from October to December and produces yellow flowers.
Seed pods form later that are curved or coiled and mostly flat except where raised over seeds.
Seeds can be collected from March to May and sown from November to February and will germinated in 3 to 10 weeks. A. oswaldii can also be grown from cuttings.

Distribution
It is native to an area in the central and southern regions of South Australia and the Northern Territory, south west Queensland, western New South Wales, northern Victoria and the Pilbara and Goldfields-Esperance regions of Western Australia.

The distribution is wide but scattered throughout arid, semi-arid and subtropical areas in all states on the mainland, occurring mainly in calcareous sands or loamy soils.

Classification
The species was initially described by the botanist Ferdinand von Mueller in 1863 in the journal Fragmenta Phytographiae Australiae. Several synonyms are known including Racosperma oswaldii, Acacia sessiliceps, Acacia amaliae var. amaliae, Acacia osswaldi, Acacia amaliae, Acacia oswaldi var. abbreviata and Acacia amaliae var. orthophylla.

The name honours Ferdinand Oswald, who was involved with the collection of the type specimen. The type specimen was collected by von Mueller in 1851 near Blanchetown on the Murray River.

See also
 List of Acacia species

References

oswaldii
Acacias of Western Australia
Flora of South Australia
Flora of the Northern Territory
Flora of Queensland
Flora of New South Wales
Flora of Victoria (Australia)
Fabales of Australia
Plants described in 1863
Taxa named by Ferdinand von Mueller